Khalisa may refer to:
 Khalsa, derived from Arabic: Khalisa, meaning pure
 Khalistan, meaning "Land of the pure"
 Kalsa, historically known as Khalisa, a quarter in the Italian city of Palermo
 Noyakert, formerly known as Khalisa, a town in Armenia
 Khalisa, a neighbourhood of the Arab city of Haifa
 al-Khalisa, a former village in Palestine

See also 
 Khalsa, in Sikhism
 Al Khalis, a town in Iraq